The J. M. Bonney House, also known as the  Josiah Morris Bonney House, is an historic Carpenter Gothic house located at 408 Princeton Avenue in Buena Vista, Chaffee County, Colorado. Built in 1883, it was named for Josiah Morris Bonney, who founded the First National Bank of Buena Vista, whose building at 210 East Main Street built the same year, was listed on the Colorado State Register August 9, 2000, and is now the Buena Vista Town Hall. The Bonney house is a good example of the more ornate period of Carpenter Gothic architecture and has been well preserved. On December 19, 1994, it  was added to the National Register of Historic Places.

See also
National Register of Historic Places listings in Chaffee County, Colorado

References

Houses on the National Register of Historic Places in Colorado
Carpenter Gothic architecture in Colorado
Houses completed in 1883
Houses in Chaffee County, Colorado
Carpenter Gothic houses in the United States
National Register of Historic Places in Chaffee County, Colorado